FC Oazis Yartsevo was a football team from Yartsevo, Russia. It played professionally from 1999 to 2001. Their best result was 12th place in the Russian Second Division Zone West in 1999.

External links
 Team history at KLISF

Association football clubs established in 1998
Association football clubs disestablished in 2002
Defunct football clubs in Russia
Sport in Smolensk Oblast
1998 establishments in Russia
2002 disestablishments in Russia